Arnold Palmer (14 September 1886 – 27 November 1973) was a British real tennis player who competed in the jeu de paume tournament at the 1908 Summer Olympics.

References

1886 births
1973 deaths
English real tennis players
Jeu de paume players at the 1908 Summer Olympics
Olympic real tennis players of Great Britain
People from South Kensington